Nitrobacter hamburgensis is a gram-negative bacterium from the genus of Nitrobacter.

References

Further reading

External links
Type strain of Nitrobacter hamburgensis at BacDive -  the Bacterial Diversity Metadatabase

Nitrobacteraceae
Bacteria described in 2001